Fhtagn nagh Yog-Sothoth is the only demo album made by the funeral doom pioneers Thergothon. It originally was released in November 1991. It was reissued in 1992 by Wild Rags Records and in 1999 by Eibon Records. The demo was reissued again by Eibon in late 2005 or early 2006. This demo was released on Vinyl in 2006 by Painiac Records, with new artwork and a bonus track titled "Dancing in the Realm of Shades" from an unreleased rehearsal.

The American funeral doom band Evoken take their name from the second track of this demo.

Track listing

 "Elemental" – 7:51  
 "Evoken" – 7:21
 "Yet the Watchers Guard" – 7:58
 "The Twilight Fade" – 1:59
 "Dancing in the Realm of Shades" (bonus track for 2006 release)

References

Demo albums
1991 albums
Thergothon albums
Cthulhu Mythos music